The 2011 Special Olympics World Summer Games, was a sporting event in Athens, Greece. The opening ceremony of the games took place on 25 June 2011 at the Panathenaic Stadium and the closing ceremony was held on 4 July 2011.

Over 7,500 athletes, from 185 countries, competed in a total of 22 sports.

Sports
 Aquatics
 Athletics
 Badminton
 Basketball
 Bocce
 Bowling
 Cricket
 Cycling
 Equestrian
 Floor hockey
 Football (Soccer)
 Golf
 Gymnastics
 Handball
 Judo
 Kayaking
 Powerlifting
 Roller skating
 Sailing
 Softball
 Table tennis
 Tennis
 Volleyball

Nations
This is a list of countries participating in the 2011 Special Olympics World Summer Games:

Afghanistan
Albania
Algeria
Andorra
Argentina
Armenia
Aruba
Australia
Austria
Azerbaijan
Bahrain
Bangladesh
Barbados
Belarus
Belgium
Belize
Benin
Bhutan
Bolivia
Bonaire
Bosnia and Herzegovina
Brazil
British Virgin Islands
Brunei
Bulgaria
Burkina Faso
Cambodia
Canada
Cayman Islands
Chile
China
Chinese Taipei
Colombia
Comoros
Republic of the Congo
Costa Rica
Croatia
Cuba
Curaçao
Cyprus
Czech Republic
Denmark
Djibouti
Dominican Republic
East Timor
Ecuador
Egypt
El Salvador
Estonia
Faroe Islands
Finland
Former Yugoslav Republic of Macedonia
France
Georgia
Germany
Gibraltar
Great Britain
Greece
Guadeloupe
Guatemala
Guyana
Haiti
Honduras
Hong Kong, China
Hungary
Iceland
India
Indonesia
Iran
Iraq
Ireland
Isle of Man
Israel
Italy
Ivory Coast
Jamaica
Japan
Jordan
Kazakhstan
Kenya
Kosovo
Kuwait
Kyrgyzstan
Laos
Latvia
Lebanon
Libya
Liechtenstein
Luxembourg
Macau, China
Malawi
Malaysia
Maldives
Mali
Malta
Mauritius
Mexico
Moldova
Monaco
Montenegro
Montserrat
Morocco
Myanmar
Namibia
Nepal
Netherlands
New Zealand
Niger
Nigeria
Norway
Oman
Pakistan
Palestine
Panama
Paraguay
Peru
Philippines
Poland
Portugal
Puerto Rico
Qatar
Réunion
Romania
Russia
Rwanda
St. Kitts and Nevis
St. Lucia
Samoa
San Marino
Saudi Arabia
Senegal
Serbia
Seychelles
Singapore
Sint Maarten
Slovakia
Slovenia
South Africa
South Korea
Spain
Sri Lanka
Sudan
Suriname
Swaziland
Sweden
Switzerland
Syria
Tajikistan
Tanzania
Thailand
The Bahamas
Tonga
Trinidad and Tobago
Tunisia
Turkey
Turkmenistan
Uganda
Ukraine
United Arab Emirates
United States of America
Uruguay
Uzbekistan
Venezuela
Vietnam
Zambia

References

External links
 Special Olympics
 2011 World Summer Games – official site

International sports competitions hosted by Greece
Special Olympics
Special
S
Multi-sport events in Greece
Sports competitions in Athens
2010s in Athens